Fintona is  a village located in County Tyrone, Northern Ireland.

Fintona may also refer to:

Fintona Girls' School, a school located in Balwyn, Victoria, Australia
Fintona Pearses, a Gaelic Athletic Association club